Rachelle Ferrell (born May 21, 1961) is an American vocalist and musician. Although she has had some success in the mainstream R&B, pop, gospel and classical music scenes, she is noted for her talents as a contemporary jazz singer. In contemporary jazz she is noted for her delivery, control, range, improvisational vocal percussion, scatting ability and access to the whistle register.

Biography
Ferrell began singing at age six, and developed a six octave range by adulthood. Her range also includes the ability to sing in the whistle register. Ferrell's highest notes in "It Only Took A Minute" (1992) have been described as "Minnie Riperton-like wailing." She received classical training in violin and the piano at an early age and was performing professionally on both instruments and as a vocalist as a teenager. After enrolling in the Berklee College of Music, and graduating a year later, having learned arrangement and developing her abilities in singing and songwriting, she secured a position teaching music for the New Jersey State Council on the Arts alongside Dizzy Gillespie.

From 1975 until 1990, Ferrell sang backup for Lou Rawls, Patti LaBelle, Vanessa Williams, and George Duke. Ferrell's debut, First Instrument, was released in 1990 in Japan, five years prior to its US release. Recorded with bassist Tyrone Brown, pianist Eddie Green and drummer Doug Nally, several famed jazz accompanists also recorded on her album. They include trumpeter Terence Blanchard, pianists Gil Goldstein and Michel Petrucciani, bassists Kenny Davis and Stanley Clarke, tenor saxophonist Wayne Shorter and keyboardist Pete Levin. Her take on standards like Sam Cooke's "You Send Me", Cole Porter's "What Is This Thing Called Love?", and Rodgers and Hart's "My Funny Valentine", gained her a substantial Japanese jazz audience.

In 2014, Rachelle Ferrell appeared on a webseries called "Now What with Kevin E. Taylor", where she was on the series season premiere. Ferrell decided, moved by Spirit, to sing her entire interview and at one point, she reduced the host to tears.

"Some people sing songs like they wear clothing, they put it on and take it off", she explains in the biographical notes accompanying First Instrument. "But when one performs four sets a night, six nights a week, that experience affords you the opportunity to present the song from the inside out, to express its essence. In this way, a singer expresses the song in the spirit in which it was written. The songwriter translates emotion into words. The singer's job is to translate the words back into emotion".

Discography

Albums

Singles

References

External links
Official site 
Rachelle Ferrell at Discogs

1964 births
Living people
Jazz musicians from Pennsylvania
Musicians from Philadelphia
Singers from Pennsylvania
Berklee College of Music alumni
American beatboxers
American women jazz singers
American jazz singers
Blue Note Records artists
Capitol Records artists
Singers with a five-octave vocal range
21st-century African-American women singers
20th-century African-American women singers
American neo soul singers